Loeselia is a genus of flowering plants in the phlox family Polemoniaceae, native to the southwestern United States, Mexico, Central America, Columbia and Venezuela. A number of species are found only in the Balsas Depression of southwestern Mexico.

Species
Currently accepted species include:

Loeselia amplectens Benth.
Loeselia campechiana C.Gut.Báez & Duno
Loeselia ciliata L.
Loeselia coerulea (Cav.) G.Don
Loeselia cordifolia Hemsl. & Rose
Loeselia glandulosa (Cav.) G.Don
Loeselia grandiflora Standl.
Loeselia greggii S.Watson
Loeselia hintoniorum B.L.Turner
Loeselia mexicana (Lam.) Brand
Loeselia pumila (M.Martens & Galeotti) Walp.
Loeselia purpusii Brandegee
Loeselia rupestris Benth.
Loeselia rzedowskii McVaugh
Loeselia spectabilis J.M.Porter & V.W.Steinm.
Loeselia tancitaroensis J.M.Porter & V.W.Steinm.

References

Polemoniaceae
Polemoniaceae genera